The 2017–18 season is FC Banants's seventeenth consecutive season in the Armenian Premier League. The club finished the previous season in 2nd, qualifying for the 2017–18 UEFA Europa League first qualifying round, whilst they will also compete in the Armenian Cup.

Squad

Transfers

In

Loans in

Out

Loans out

Released

Competitions

Overall record

Premier League

Results summary

Results

Table

Armenian Cup

Statistics

Appearances and goals

|-
|colspan="14"|Players who left Banants during the season:

|}

Goal scorers

Clean sheets

Disciplinary Record

References

FC Urartu seasons
Banants